Semkovo is a  ski resort  in the  Rila Mountains of Bulgaria. It is located at 1750 metres above sea level, and is located 14 kilometres from the town of Belitsa.

Semkovo is a stunning resort situated in the foothills of the Rila Mountains, offering breathtaking views of the Pirin Mountains and surrounded by enchanting spruce and pine forests. The resort boasts a Mediterranean climate with a noticeable mountain influence, making it an ideal vacation spot for visitors seeking natural beauty and moderate temperatures.

Despite its small size, Semkovo features several holiday villages and cabins, with notable structures such as the guest house of the Technical University of Sofia and the guesthouse of the University of Architecture, Geodesy and Civil Engineering. The two universities jointly operate the resort's public ski lifts, providing visitors with easy access to the resort's ski slopes.

Recently Semkovo became famous for the Coliving Semkovo project, where a group of digital nomads are revitalizing the former Hotel Rila into a co-op operated coliving space.

References

Semkovo.com
Bulgariaski.com

Ski areas and resorts in Bulgaria
Buildings and structures in Blagoevgrad Province
Tourist attractions in Blagoevgrad Province